Alan N. Willson Jr. (born 1939) is the Distinguished Emeritus Professor and Charles P. Reames Chair of Electrical Engineering at University of California, Los Angeles, mainly, working with digital signs and systems processing, and also a published author, being held in 262 libraries, the highest held being in 252 libraries.

Wilson earned his undergraduate degree at Georgia Tech and his Ph.D. at Syracuse University.

Awards
He has been given numerous awards and honors including: 
 member of the National Academy of Engineering 
 Fellow of the Institute of Electrical and Electronics Engineers (IEEE), 
 IEEE Vitold Belevitch Award
 IEEE Mac Van Valkenburg Award
 IEEE Walter Ransom Gail Baker Award
 George Westinghouse Award
 IEEE Gustav Robert Kirchhoff Award - 2018

References

American electrical engineers
UCLA Henry Samueli School of Engineering and Applied Science faculty
American essayists
1939 births
Living people
Members of the United States National Academy of Engineering
Fellow Members of the IEEE
Georgia Tech alumni
Syracuse University alumni